Alfred Kirchner (born 22 May 1937) is a German actor, theatre director (especially for opera) and theatre manager who is based in  Berlin. He worked at theatres such as Theater Bremen, Schauspielhaus Bochum, the Burgtheater in Vienna and the Staatliche Schauspielbühnen Berlin, before turning to freelance work. He has staged productions in Europe and North America, including several world premieres of both drama and opera. He directed the premiere of Martin Walser's Ein Kinderspiel in Stuttgart in 1971, the U.S. premiere of Henze's We Come to the River at the Santa Fe Opera in 1984, and the premiere of Hans Zender's Stephen Climax at the Oper Frankfurt in 1986. In 1994, he staged Wagner's Der Ring des Nibelungen at the Bayreuth Festival.

Life 
Kirchner was born in Göppingen, the son of a Schriftleiter. He first worked as an actor and assistant stage director (Regieassistent) at the Theater Kiel. At the Theater Bremen from 1964 to 1971, he first assisted Peter Zadek and Peter Palitzsch. Kirchner is married; the couple have two daughters and live in Berlin and Stuttgart.

Career 
Kirchner's first theatre staging was Hall/Waterhouse's Lügen-Billy in Bremen in 1965. He worked at the Schauspielhaus Bochum with Hans Schalla. From 1972 to 1979, he led the drama section of the Staatstheater Stuttgart as Oberspielleiter. He staged as a guest at international theatres, opera houses and festivals, including New York City, the Wiener Festwochen, the Holland Festival in Amsterdam and the Mülheimer Theatertage. In 1979, he and other members of the Stuttgart theatre moved with Peymann to Bochum. When Peymann moved again to the Burgtheater in Vienna in 1986, Kirchner followed.

Kirchner then worked as a freelance opera director, including the Oper Frankfurt, Leipzig Opera, Vienna State Opera and Hamburg State Opera. He participated at Berliner Theatertreffen several times. He also staged operas internationally, in Zürich, Barcelona, Oslo, Moscow, Strasbourg, Montpellier, Toulouse, Oviedo, Dallas, Santiago de Chile and often at the Santa Fe Opera, including the U.S. premieres of Henze's We Come to the River and Venus and Adonis. In 1994, he staged Wagner's Der Ring des Nibelungen at the Bayreuth Festival.

Kirchner collaborated with conductors such as Michael Gielen, Claudio Abbado, Nikolaus Harnoncourt, James Levine, Gerd Albrecht, Paolo Carignani, Graeme Jenkins, Dennis Russell Davies and Bertrand de Billy. Besides classical repertoire in drama and opera, he focused on contemporary works. He staged world premieres of playwrights such as Martin Walser, Peter Turrini, Heiner Müller, Herbert Achternbusch, Dario Fo, Maxim Gorki and Gerlind Reinshagen and composers such as Helmut Lachenmann, Hans Zender and Udo Zimmermann.

Kirchner taught at the University of Georgia, the Musikhochschule Hamburg, Hamburg University, and the Hochschule für Musik "Hanns Eisler".

Productions 

  by Martin Walser, Stuttgart 1971, world premiere

 Die kahle Sängerin, Stuttgart 1974

 Das Sauspiel by Walser, with music by Mikis Theodorakis, Schauspielhaus Hamburg 1976, world premiere 
 Sonntagskinder by Gerlind Reinshagen, Stuttgart 1976, world premiere
 Der Entaklemmer by Thaddäus Troll after Molière's L'Avare, Stuttgart 1976, world premiere

 Jenůfa, conductor Michael Gielen, Oper Frankfurt 1979
 Die Soldaten, Gielen, Oper Frankfurt 1980

 Die wundersame Schustersfrau by Udo Zimmermann, Schwetzingen Festival 1982, world premiere
 Die Heilige Johanna der Schlachthöfe, Bochum 1980, Amsterdam 1981
 Mutter Courage und ihre Kinder, Bochum 1981
 Über allen Gipfeln ist Ruh by Thomas Bernhard, Bochum 1981, world premiere at the Ludwigsburg Festival
 Ein Maskenball, Oper Frankfurt 1982
 Nachtwache by Lars Norén, Bochum 1982, German premiere
 Wolokolamsker Chaussee I by Heiner Müller, Bochum 1983, West German premiere

 We Come to the River by Henze, conductor Dennis Russell Davies, Santa Fe Opera 1984, U.S. premiere
 Eugen Onegin, Oper Frankfurt 1984

 Stephen Climax by Hans Zender, Oper Frankfurt 1986, world premiere

 An der Donau by Herbert Achternbusch, Akademietheater 1987, world premiere
 Die Minderleister by Peter Turrini, Akademietheater 1987, world premiere, also at the Mülheimer Theatertage

 Don Giovanni, conductor Nikolaus Harnoncourt, Amsterdam 1988
 Khovanshchina, conductor Claudio Abbado, Vienna State Opera 1989
 Faust, Berlin 1990
 Idomeneo, Hamburg State Opera 1990

 Der Ring des Nibelungen, conductor James Levine, Bayreuth Festival 1994 to 1998
 Der Freischütz, Vienna 1995
 Die Nase by Shostakovich, Oper Leipzig 1997
 Tosca, Oper Frankfurt 1998
 Die Zauberflöte, Oper Frankfurt 1998
 Manon Lescaut, Oper Frankfurt 1999
 Venus and Adonis by Henze, Santa Fe Opera 2000, U.S. premiere

 Tristan und Isolde, conductor Simon Rattle, Amsterdam 2001

 Tristan und Isolde, conductor De Billy, Barcelona 2002

  by Henze after Miguel de Cervantes, Montepulciano 2006, for the composer's 80th birthday

 Lohengrin, conductor Graeme Jenkins, Dallas Opera 2007
 Tristan und Isolde, conductor Ingo Metzmacher, Amsterdam 2008
 Don Giovanni, Magdeburg and Oviedo 2009
 Tosca, Volksoper Vienna 2009

 Die lustigen Weiber von Windsor, Vienna 2010 and Tokyo 2012

 Hermann und Dorothea, Burgtheater 2016, also Berliner Ensemble and Ruhrfestspiele 2017

Publications
Alfred Kirchner: Der Mann von Pölarölara. Autobiografische Splitter. Vienna: Hollitzer 2019 .

References

External links 

German theatre directors
German opera directors
German theatre managers and producers
1937 births
Living people
People from Göppingen